Bro is a slang term for a male friend, truncated from "". It may also refer to:

Arts and entertainment
 Bro (novel), by Vladimir Sorokin
 Bro (TV channel), Philippines
 Bro (instrument), a Vietnamese musical instrument

Astronomy
 10128 Bro, one of the asteroids in the main belt

Botany
 Broughtonia or Bro, an orchid genus

Computer science
 Bro, later Zeek, a network analysis framework

Initials
 Brownsville/South Padre Island International Airport, Texas, U.S., IATA code
 Big Red One, nickname of the US 1st Infantry Division
 Border Roads Organisation, Indian military unit

People
 Bro (singer) (born 1996), Dane Kevin Andreasen
 Jakob Bro (born 1978), Danish guitarist and composer
 Nicolas Bro (born 1972), Danish actor

Places 
 Bro, Stockholm, Sweden
 Bro, Gotland, Sweden
 Kristinehamn, formerly Bro or Broo, Värmland County, Sweden

Sports 
 BrO-23, a primary glider built in the USSR in the early 1980s

Other
 Bro culture, male partying subculture

See also
 Bros (disambiguation)